DND Finance is an Anglo-Canadian business providing finance across the business loan, vehicle, equipment finance, and leasing markets. Founded in 2000 by Bill Dost in Canada as D&D Leasing, the business expanded to the United Kingdom in 2009. The business rebranded to DND Finance in 2019 as it expanded its operations beyond leasing.

Activities

In August 2018, the business obtained a £20m wholesale funding facility from Wesleyan Bank to enable lending to British SMEs.

In 2019, DND Finance agreed a multi-year financing agreement with cosmetics platform Aqiok in order to help the firm develop a lending app. In the same year, DND Finance also provided $1 million to Canadian funding solution provider Benjamin Verde, an artist and entertainment funding solutions provider.

In 2022, DND Finance launched the Score Mastercard, which was reported to be the UK's first Shariah-certified credit card. This followed the launch of DND's Secured Charge Card by Visa in 2019.

In 2022, DND Finance Managing Director Bill Dost was appointed to the board of the Finance and Leasing Association of the United Kingdom.

References

Financial services companies of Canada
Leasing companies
Companies established in 2000